Argyroeides vespina is a moth of the subfamily Arctiinae. It was described by Schaus in 1901. It is found in Paraguay and Brazil.

References

Moths described in 1901
Argyroeides
Moths of South America